Ranqueles may refer to:

 Ranquel people, an ethnic group of Argentina
 Ranqueles (beetle), a genus of beetles